Gregorempista is a monotypic snout moth genus described by Rolf-Ulrich Roesler in 1969. Its single species, Gregorempista validella, described by Hugo Theodor Christoph in 1877, is known from Turkmenistan.

References

Phycitinae
Monotypic moth genera
Moths of Asia